Acestrorhynchus altus is a species of fish in the family Acestrorhynchidae. It was described by Naércio Aquino de Menezes in 1969. It inhabits the Amazon River basin, at a pH range of 5.5-7.2.

A. altus feeds off of bony fish.

References

Acestrorhynchidae
Taxa named by Naércio Aquino de Menezes
Fish described in 1969